James Baillie may refer to:

James Baillie (Canadian politician) (1860–1935), former mayor of Aylmer, Quebec
James Baillie (merchant) (c. 1737–1793), merchant and MP for Horsham
James Evan Baillie (1781–1863), British West Indies merchant, landowner and Whig politician
James Black Baillie (1872–1940), British moral philosopher and Vice-Chancellor of the University of Leeds
James Evan Bruce Baillie (1859–1931), Unionist MP for Inverness-shire
James Baillie (footballer) (born 1996), English footballer
Sir James Baillie, 2nd Baronet of the Baillie baronets

See also
James Bailie (1890–1967), Northern Irish unionist politician
James Bailey (disambiguation)
James Bayley (disambiguation)